The Porsche 906 or Carrera 6 is a street-legal racing car from Porsche. It was announced in January 1966 and 50 examples were subsequently produced, thus meeting the homologation requirements of the FIA's new Group 4 Sports Car category to the number. The type would also compete in modified form in the Group 6 Sports Prototype class.

History 
Prior to the Porsche 906 was the 904 which held many racing victories. At the age of 28, Ferdinand Piëch, the grandson of Ferdinand Porsche was given the important job of being in charge of the development of the new Porsche racing cars. His goal for recreating the 904 to the new 906 was to make it as lightweight as can be. This would mean stripping all of heavy steel from the body and using unstressed fiberglass instead. Constructing the new car with the fiberglass helped with things such as structural support as well as looks because it was all placed by hand instead of having an uneven paint job done to it.

The finished product weighed around 580 kg (1,280 lbs) and was around 250 lbs lighter than the previous 904. Not only was the body of the car much lighter but so was the engine of the vehicle. Normally the car would be fitted with a 901/20 6-cylinder with carburetors that was making 210 horsepower at 8,000 rpm.  On occasion though there would be times when it was replaced with a 8-cylinder when the car was being used by the factory racing team.  This would help in events such as hillclimbing when the altitude would increase against the Ferrari Dinos in the European championship.

Racing history 

In its debut in the 1966 24 Hours of Daytona, the Carrera 6 finished 6th overall, and won its class against Ferrari Dino 206 Ps. At the 12 Hours of Sebring, Hans Herrmann/Herbert Müller finished fourth overall and won the class, as well as at the 1000 km of Monza, Spa, and Nürburgring.

Willy Mairesse/Gerhard Müller, driving a privately entered 906, secured an overall victory at the 1966 Targa Florio when the factory cars failed. At the 1966 24 Hours of Le Mans, the 906 placed 4-5-6-7 behind three Ford GT40 Mk IIs, outlasting all of the previously dominant V12-engined Ferrari Ps.

For the year of the car's debut in 1966, it achieved numerous victories. American-British race car driver Ken Miles took the 2.0-liter class in the Las Vegas Stardust and Laguna Seca USRRC races. These victories didn't just stop in 1966, but went on through 1967 and 1968. Another well known Porsche driver by the name of Peter Gregg secured himself some wins at the Bahama Speed Weeks. Now not only were professional racers driving these cars, but so was comedian Dick Smothers and Fred Baker. They secured eighth overall to win its 2.0-liter class in 1969.

Construction 
At the time it showed a close resemblance to future Porsche racing cars. As in the Mercedes-Benz 300SL, gull-wing doors were fitted, and the mid-ship mounted engine was covered with a large plexiglas cover. The Porsche 906 was fitted with an engine that actually came from the Porsche 911 just with a few modifications done to it. These changes included some exotic metals in the connecting rods and the crank case to help the car perform at a higher level.

In order to save money, spare suspension components produced in advance for a possible new series of Porsche 904 had to be used for the 906, along with big 15-inch wheels. Yet, Formula One used lighter 13-inch wheels, and Porsche had already used Team Lotus suspension parts in earlier years. The wheels were bolted on with 5 nuts as in a road car, which cost time in pitstops compared to a single central nut. Porsche had reused a lot of different parts on the 906 like the suspension from the 904 and the engine from the 911, but they had also utilized the 5 speed manual gearbox that came from the Porsche 911.

To take advantage of the lighter wheels and F1 tyres, the Porsche 910 was developed and entered in mid-season of 1966, starting with the hillclimb from Sierre to Crans-Montana in Switzerland.

References

Sports racing cars
24 Hours of Le Mans race cars
Sports prototypes
906
Rear mid-engine, rear-wheel-drive vehicles
Cars powered by boxer engines
Automobiles with gull-wing doors
Cars introduced in 1966